Laurie Gwen Shapiro is an American writer and filmmaker. She resides in New York City, where she was born and raised, and is a graduate of Stuyvesant High School. The 2001 documentary film Keep the River on Your Right: A Modern Cannibal Tale, which she co-produced and co-directed with her brother David, received numerous awards, including:

 Best Documentary Feature; Hamptons International Film Festival, 2000
 Special Jury Award; International Documentary Film Festival Amsterdam, 2000
 Audience Award, Special Critics Award; Los Angeles Independent Film Festival, 2000
 Truer Than Fiction Award; IFP Independent Spirit Awards, 2001
 Best Documentary; Newport Beach Film Festival, 2001
 Nominated for 2010 Emmy for Finishing Heaven – Producer

Her semi-autobiographical first novel, The Unexpected Salami, was named an ALA Notable Book in 1998.

Books 
 (1998) The Unexpected Salami (Algonquin Books)
 (2004) The Anglophile (Red Dress Ink)
 (2005) The Matzo Ball Heiress (Red Dress Ink)
 (2006) Brand X: The Boyfriend Account (Random House)
 (2018) The Stowaway: A Young Man's Extraordinary Adventure to Antarctica (Simon & Schuster)
 (2019) Passager Clandestin, éditions Paulsen

Films 
 (1999) The McCourts of Limerick (Cinemax) (co-producer)
 (2000) The McCourts of New York (Cinemax) (co-producer)
 (2001) Keep The River on Your Right: A Modern Cannibal Tale (IFC) (co-producer/co-director)
 (2008) Finishing Heaven (HBO) (producer)
 (2013) The Manor (in production) (executive producer)
 LowLine (in production) (director)

Plays 
 (2002) Inventing Color

References

External links 

 
 
 

Year of birth missing (living people)
American women film directors
American women novelists
Living people
Writers from New York City
Stuyvesant High School alumni
20th-century American novelists
20th-century American women writers
21st-century American novelists
21st-century American women writers
Film directors from New York City
Novelists from New York (state)